Oumar Traoré (born 20 July 2002) is a Malian footballer who currently plays for Al Jazira.

Career statistics

Club

Notes

International

International goals
Scores and results list Mali's goal tally first.

References

2002 births
Living people
Malian footballers
Mali international footballers
Malian expatriate footballers
Association football midfielders
UAE Pro League players
Stade Malien players
Al Jazira Club players
Expatriate footballers in the United Arab Emirates
Malian expatriate sportspeople in the United Arab Emirates
21st-century Malian people